The 2014 Bukidnon bus bombing occurred on December 9, 2014 when a bomb hit a bus just in front of the main entrance of Central Mindanao University along Sayre Highway in Sitio Musuan, Barangay Dologon, Maramag, Bukidnon. The blast killed at least 11 people and another 43 were wounded. Most of the victims were students who were about to go home when the incident occurred. The bus is owned by transport company, Rural Transit Mindanao Incorporated bearing the traffic number 2640 and plate number KVS-164. The bus is en route to Cagayan de Oro from Banisilan, North Cotabato.

The Bangsamoro Islamic Freedom Fighters were suspected by Philippine authorities to be behind the bombings. Extortion is viewed as a motive for the attacks due to claims that the bus company has faced threats for refusing to pay protection money to the militants. The militant group denies any involvement claiming they would not gain any benefit from conducting such attacks and claims the accusations against them as fabrication.

References

Attacks in Asia in 2014
Terrorist incidents in the Philippines in 2014
2014 disasters in the Philippines
Mass murder in 2014
Bus bombings in Asia
History of Bukidnon
2014 murders in the Philippines